Mediterranean cuisine is the food and methods of preparation used by the people of the Mediterranean Basin. The idea of a Mediterranean cuisine originates with the cookery writer Elizabeth David's book, A Book of Mediterranean Food (1950) and was amplified by other writers working in English. 

Many writers define the three core elements of the cuisine as the olive, wheat, and the grape, yielding olive oil, bread and pasta, and wine; other writers deny that the widely varied foods of the Mediterranean basin constitute a cuisine at all. A common definition of the geographical area covered, proposed by David, follows the distribution of the olive tree.

The region spans a wide variety of cultures with distinct cuisines, in particular (going anticlockwise around the region) the  Maghrebi, Egyptian, Levantine, Ottoman (Turkish), Greek, Italian, French (Provençal), and Spanish, though some authors include additional cuisines. Portuguese cuisine, in particular, is partly Mediterranean in character.

The historical connections of the region, as well as the impact of the Mediterranean Sea on the region's climate and economy, mean that these cuisines share dishes beyond the core trio of oil, bread, and wine, such as roast lamb or mutton, meat stews with vegetables and tomato (for example, Spanish andrajos), vegetable stews (Provençal ratatouille, Spanish pisto, Italian ciambotta), and the salted cured fish roe, bottarga, found across the region. Spirits based on anise are drunk in many countries around the Mediterranean.

The cooking of the area is not to be confused with the Mediterranean diet, made popular because of the apparent health benefits of a diet rich in olive oil, wheat and other grains, fruits, vegetables, and a certain amount of seafood, but low in meat and dairy products. Mediterranean cuisine encompasses the ways that these and other ingredients, including meat, are dealt with in the kitchen, whether they are health-giving or not.

Geography

Various authors have defined the scope of Mediterranean cooking either by geography or by its core ingredients.

Elizabeth David, in her A Book of Mediterranean Food (1950), defines her scope as "the cooking of the Mediterranean shores" and sketches out the geographical limits:

Despite this definition, David's book focuses largely on Spain, France, Italy, and Greece.

She defines this region as coextensive with the range of the olive tree: "those blessed lands of sun and sea and olive trees". The olive's natural distribution is limited by frost and by availability of water. It is therefore constrained to a more or less narrow zone around the Mediterranean Sea, except in the Maghreb and in the Iberian Peninsula, where it is distributed more widely, and on the islands of the Mediterranean, where it is widespread.

The Tunisian historian Mohamed Yassine Essid similarly defines the region by the olive's presence, along with bread, wheat, and the grape  as the "basic products of Mediterranean folk cuisine":

Other authors question that there is any such common core:

Some writers include the cuisines of the eastern Adriatic coast of Dalmatia – Albanian, Montenegrin, and Croatian, while most do not mention them. Some writers also include areas not touching the Mediterranean Sea or supporting olive cultivation, including Serbian, Macedonian, and Portuguese cuisine.

Key ingredients
Essid identifies the "trinity" of basic ingredients of traditional Mediterranean cuisine as the olive, wheat, and the grape, yielding oil, bread, and wine respectively. The archaeologist Colin Renfrew calls this the "Mediterranean triad".

Olive

The olive appears to come from the region of Persia and Mesopotamia, at least 6,000 years ago. It spread from there to nearby areas, and has been cultivated since the early Bronze Age (up to 3,150 BC) in southern Turkey, the Levant, and Crete. The ten countries with the largest harvests (in 2011) are all near the Mediterranean (Portugal being the tenth largest): together, they produce 95% of the world's olives.

The olive yields bitter fruits, made edible by curing and fermentation, and olive oil. Some 90% of the fruit production (1996) goes into olive oil. The Mediterranean region accounts for the world's highest consumption of olive oil: in 2014, the highest-consuming country, Greece, used 17 kg per head; Italy, 12 kg, Spain, 13 kg; the United States for comparison used only 1 kg per head.

Wheat

Wheat was domesticated in the Fertile Crescent, in and near the Levant some 10,000 years ago. Its ancestors include wild emmer wheat; this was hybridised, harvested and sown to create domestic strains with larger grains, in ears that shatter less readily than wild forms. It was spread across the Mediterranean region as far as Spain by 5,000 BC.

Wheat is a staple food in the Mediterranean region. Wheat bread was already critically important in the empire of Ancient Rome, which included the entire region; at that time, around 2,000 years ago, North Africa was the "breadbasket" of the empire. Other staple wheat-based Mediterranean foods include pasta and semolina (wheat middlings) products such as couscous and bulgur. In turn, these are made into dishes such as the Greek dessert galaktoboureko (milk börek), consisting of filo pastry parcels around a custard made with semolina. A widespread wheat dish from Turkey and the Levant to Iran and India is halva, a dessert of sweetened semolina with butter, milk, and pine kernels.

Grape

The grape was domesticated between 7,000 and 4,000 BC between the Black Sea and Persia; archaeological evidence shows that wine was being made there by 6,000 BC, reaching Greece and Crete in the fifth millennium BC and Spain by the last millennium BC. Winemaking started in Italy in the ninth century BC, and in France around 600 BC.

Grapes are mostly grown for making wine and vinegar as basic components of the Mediterranean diet, as well for drying as raisins or for eating as table grapes. Raisins and table grape varieties are chosen for their flavour. Grape production remains important in the Mediterranean area, with Southern Europe accounting for 21% of the world's harvest. In 2014, Italy produced 6.9 million tonnes (mt) of grapes, Spain 6.2 mt, France 6.2 mt, Turkey 4.2 mt, and Germany 1.2 mt. Wine production for Southern Europe was 37% of the world total in 2014, with Italy producing 4.8 mt, Spain 4.6 mt, France 4.3 mt, and Germany 0.9 mt.

History

Concept

The concept of a Mediterranean cuisine is very recent, probably dating from the publication of David's A Book of Mediterranean Food (1950). David herself did not use the term, speaking instead of Mediterranean "food", "cookery", or "cooking". The usefulness of the concept is disputed. Carol Helstosky, author of the book Food Culture in the Mediterranean (2009), is among the authors who use "Mediterranean cuisine" interchangeably with "Mediterranean food". In the preface to her book she writes: 

Essid acknowledges that "geographical differences and the vicissitudes of history" have affected the food of different Mediterranean lands, but nonetheless asserts that:

On the other hand, Sami Zubaida argues in his book Culinary Cultures of the Middle East (1994) that:

The cookery author Clifford A. Wright wrote in 1999: "There really is no such thing as 'Mediterranean cuisine'. At the same time, we seem to know what we mean when we use the expression ..." Wright argued that David's book itself was largely about specifically French Mediterranean food, pointing out that "only 4 percent of her recipes come from North Africa or the Levant", so that the focus was on an aspect of European cuisine, largely omitting coverage of Middle Eastern cuisine.

Since David's time, a variety of books on Mediterranean cuisine have been written, including Abu Shihab's 2012 book of that name; Helstosky's 2009 book; books by other cookery writers include S. Rowe's Purple Citrus and Sweet Perfume: Cuisine of the Eastern Mediterranean (2011); and Mari-Pierre Moine's  Mediterranean Cookbook (2014). There are many more cookbooks covering specific cuisines in the Mediterranean area, such as B. Santich's The Original Mediterranean Cuisine: Medieval Recipes for Today (1995), on Catalan and Italian recipes; and H. F. Ullman's (2006) on the cooking of Tunisia, Spain and Italy, each one subtitled "Mediterranean Cuisine".

Origins

The ingredients of Mediterranean cuisine are to an extent different from those of the cuisine of Northern Europe, with olive oil instead of butter, wine instead of beer. The list of available ingredients has changed over the centuries. One major change was the introduction of many foods by the Arabs to Portugal, Spain and Sicily in the Middle Ages. Those foods included aubergines, spinach, sugar cane, rice, apricots and citrus fruits, creating the distinctive culinary tradition of Al-Andalus.
 
Another major change was the arrival of foods from the Americas in Early Modern times (around the sixteenth century), notably the incorporation of the potato into Northern European cuisine, and the eager adoption of the tomato into Mediterranean cuisine. The tomato, so central now to that cuisine, was first described in print by Pietro Andrea Mattioli in 1544. Similarly, many of the species of Phaseolus beans now used around the Mediterranean, including P. vulgaris (the French or haricot bean), were brought back from the Americas by Spanish and Portuguese explorers.

Cooking

David's introduction to her 1950 book characterises the cooking of the Mediterranean countries as "conditioned naturally by variations in climate and soil and the relative industry or indolence of the inhabitants."

David identifies "the ever recurring elements" in the food of this extensive region as olive oil, saffron, garlic, "pungent" local wines, as well as the "aromatic perfume" of herbs, especially rosemary, wild marjoram, and basil, and the bright colours of fresh foods in the markets, "pimentos, aubergines, tomatoes, olives, melons, figs" and "shiny fish, silver, vermilion, or tiger-striped". She includes cheeses of "sheep's or goat's milk", "figs from Smyrna on long strings" and "sheets of apricot paste which is dissolved in water to make a cooling drink."

With common ingredients including the olive, wheat, and grape; a shared climate; and a long period for cultural exchange, it might be expected that a single, pan-Mediterranean cuisine would have developed. Certain items, such as olive oil, bread, wine, roast lamb or mutton (for example, Maghrebi méchoui, Greek kleftiko and souvlaki, Turkish shish kebab), bottarga, and stews of meat with vegetables and tomato (such as Spanish andrajos, French , Italian ciambotta, Turkish buğu kebabı), are indeed found all around the Mediterranean. Seafood including sea bream and squid is eaten, often in stews, stuffed, or fried, in Spanish, French, and Italian dishes. Despite this, however, the lands bordering the Mediterranean sea have distinct regional cuisines, from the Maghrebi, Levant and Ottoman to the Italian, French, and Spanish. Each of those, in turn, has national and provincial variations.

Maghrebi

Mediterranean Maghrebi cuisine includes the cuisines of  Algeria, Libya, Morocco, and Tunisia. One of the most characteristic dishes of the region is couscous, a steamed, small-grained wheat semolina, served with a stew. The dish is ancient, mentioned by the Medieval traveller Ibn Battuta, and found for example also in the Western Sicilian cuisine, especially in the province of Trapani, where it was re-introduced after 1600.

One stew that may be served with couscous is the Moroccan tagine, a hearty, somewhat dry dish of meat and vegetables, cooked slowly in a pot (called a tagine) with a tall conical lid. Dishes from the Maghreb region of North Africa are often coloured and flavoured with the hot spice mixtures harissa and ras el hanout (containing such spices as cumin, coriander, saffron, cinnamon, cloves, chillies, and paprika). Other characteristic flavourings of the region are preserved lemons and dried apricots and raisins.

Egyptian

Egyptian cuisine has ancient roots, with evidence that, for example, cheese has been made in Egypt since at least 3,000 BC. Falafel are small fried croquettes of bean or chickpea flour, currently also eaten across the Levant and the West, but originating in Egypt's Roman era; they are claimed as theirs by Coptic Christians. Duqqa is a dip made of pounded herbs, hazelnuts and spices, eaten with bread. Kushari is a vegan dish of rice, lentils and pasta, variously garnished; it began as food for the poor, but has become a national dish.

Levantine

Levantine cuisine is the cooking of the Levant (including the Middle Eastern Mediterranean coast, east of Egypt). Among the most distinctive foods of this cuisine are traditional small meze dishes such as tabbouleh, hummus, and baba ghanoush. Tabbouleh is a dish of bulgur cracked wheat with tomatoes, parsley, mint and onion, dressed with olive oil and lemon juice. Baba ghanoush, sometimes called "poor man's caviar", is a puree of aubergine with olive oil, often mixed with chopped onion, tomato, cumin, garlic, lemon juice, and parsley. The dish is popular across the whole of the Eastern Mediterranean and North Africa.

Ful medames, originally from Egypt and still a national dish there, consists of fava beans with oil and cumin; it is popular throughout the Levant. The dish may be ancient: dried beans of Neolithic age have been found near Nazareth.

Ottoman

Ottoman cuisine has given rise to the cuisines of modern Turkey, parts of the Balkans, Cyprus, and Greece. A distinctive element is the family of small flaky pastries called börek. These are popular and widespread across the Eastern Mediterranean region, and date as far back as ancient Roman times. Börek are made of thin sheets of filo pastry, filled with mixtures such as meat, caramelised onion and sweet peppers.

Another widespread and popular dish is moussaka, a baked dish of aubergine or potato with various other ingredients: often minced meat and tomatoes, sometimes a layer of egg custard or béchamel sauce on top. In its Greek variant, well known outside the region, it includes layers of aubergine and minced meat with custard or béchamel sauce on top, but that version is a relatively recent innovation, introduced by the chef Nikolaos Tselementes in the 1920s.

Greek

Greek cookery makes wide use of vegetables, olive oil, grains, fish, wine and meat (white and red, including lamb, poultry, rabbit and pork). Other important ingredients include olives, cheese, aubergine, courgette, lemon juice, vegetables, herbs, bread and yoghurt. Some more dishes that can be traced back to Ancient Greece are: lentil soup, fasolada, retsina (white or rosé wine flavoured with pine resin) and pasteli (sesame seeds baked with honey); some to the Hellenistic and Roman periods include: loukaniko (dried pork sausage); and Byzantium: feta cheese, avgotaraho (bottarga) and paximadhia (rusk). Lakerda (pickled fish), mizithra cheese and desserts like diples, koulourakia, moustokouloura and melomakarono also date back to the Byzantine period, while the variety of different pitas probably dates back to ancient times. Much of Greek cuisine is part of the larger tradition of Ottoman cuisine, the names of the dishes revealing Arabic, Persian or Turkish roots: moussaka, tzatziki, yuvarlakia, keftes and so on. Many dishes' names probably entered the Greek vocabulary during Ottoman times, or earlier in contact with the Persians and the Arabs. However, some dishes may be pre-Ottoman, only taking Turkish names later; the historians of food John Ash and Andrew Dalby, for example, speculate that grape-leaf dolmadhes were made by the early Byzantine period, while Alan Davidson traces trahana to the ancient Greek tragos and skordalia to the ancient Athenian skorothalmi.

Balkan

David barely mentioned the non-Greek Balkans, stating only that yoghurt and moussaka are widespread in the region. Some later cooks like Paula Wolfert give a few recipes from Dalmatia, some being Ottoman. 

Albena Shkodrova notes that the cuisines of the coastal provinces of Istria and Dalmatia were influenced by Venice. She adds that cuisines labelled as "Italian" and "Mediterranean" are becoming popular in the Balkans, which she calls "a historical crossroads of Oriental, Mediterranean and Central-European influences".

Italian

Mediterranean Italian cuisine includes much of Italy outside the north and the mountainous inland regions. It is a diverse cuisine, but among its best-known and most characteristic foods are risotto, pizza in Neapolitan and Sicilian styles, and pasta dishes such as spaghetti.

Risotto is a dish made using Italian short-grain rice, which is both highly absorbent and resistant to turning into a pudding when cooked with stock and flavoured with onions and garlic, cooked in butter. Anna Gosetti della Salda's book of Italian regional cookery lists 37 risotto recipes, 18 of them from the Veneto. Variations among Veneto risottos include additions of fish and white wine; chicken; eel; mushrooms and grated Parmesan cheese; quails; small pieces of beef; courgettes (zucchini); clams; ragù; beans; mussels; prawns; cuttlefish; and asparagus.

Pizza, or as David notes "pissaladina or pissaladière" in Provence (the cuisines of Mediterranean France and Italy having something in common), is a piece of bread dough rolled out thin, with a topping which varies from place to place, but is generally much simpler than those in the English-speaking world. In Naples this is tomato, anchovies and buffalo mozzarella. In San Remo it is onions cooked in olive oil, with salted sardines. The Provençal variety uses onions, black olives, and anchovies.

Spaghetti dishes also vary. It may be eaten as David says "simply with olive oil and garlic", without cheese, or with a sauce of "very red and ripe peeled tomatoes", cooked briefly and flavoured with garlic and either basil or parsley. One Sicilian variant includes pieces of bacon, onions fried in fat, garlic, stoned olives, and anchovies, served with olive oil and grated Parmesan cheese.

French

 

Mediterranean French cuisine includes the cooking styles of Provence, Occitania, and the island of Corsica. Distinctive dishes that make use of local ingredients include bouillabaisse and salade niçoise.

Bouillabaisse is a substantial dish from the French port of Marseille, capital of Provence. It is a stew for at least eight people, because it should contain many kinds of fish such as crayfish, gurnard, weever, John Dory, monkfish, conger eel, whiting, sea bass, and crab. These are cooked with Mediterranean vegetables and herbs, namely onions, garlic, tomatoes, thyme, fennel, parsley, bay, and orange peel.

Salade niçoise is a colourful salad of tomatoes, tuna, hard-boiled eggs, Niçoise olives, and anchovies, dressed with a vinaigrette.

Spanish

Spain's varied Mediterranean cuisines includes the cooking of Andalusia, Murcia, Catalonia, Valencia, and the Balearic islands. Paella is a characteristic Spanish dish, originally from Valencia, radiating early on to Catalonia and Murcia along Spain's Mediterranean coast. It comes in many versions, and may contain a mixture of chicken, pork, rabbit, or shellfish, sautéed in olive oil in a large shallow pan, with vegetables, and typically round-grain rice (often of the local albufera, arròs bomba, sénia varieties or similar) cooked to absorb the water and coloured with saffron. The dish may be varied with artichoke hearts, peas, sweet peppers, lima beans, string beans, or sausages.

Portuguese: partly Mediterranean 

Portugal lies on the Atlantic, not the Mediterranean, but it is in the Mediterranean basin, characterised by olive groves and a Mediterranean climate, except on the wetter Atlantic coast. Its cuisine too is partly Mediterranean, with the usual trio of bread, wine, and olive oil, but also partly Atlantic, with a tradition of fishing and many seafood dishes such as seafood rice (arroz de Marisco), clams, squid (lulas grelhadas), and bacalhau, imported salted cod. There are, equally, many meat dishes, using chicken, pork, and rabbit. Other major ingredients are onions, garlic, bay leaves, sweet peppers (pimentão), cloves, and chouriço sausage. Portuguese vegetables include the tomatoes common in Mediterranean cuisine, but also kale, carrots, and broad beans. Sweet dishes include pastéis de nata, custard tarts with cinnamon. The country produces red wines such as Alentejo.

Anise spirits

Anise is used around the Mediterranean to flavour various traditional spirits, including:
 
 French pastis and absinthe 
 Greek ouzo
 Italian sambuca
 Spanish anísado
 Balkan rakı
 Levantine arak
 Algerian anisette cristal

Mediterranean diet and cuisine

The Mediterranean diet, popularised in the 1970s, is inspired by the cuisine of parts of Greece and Italy in the early 1960s. The American Diabetes Association writes about "Mediterranean-Style Eating", mentioning "the traditional Mediterranean lifestyle ... of ... eating healthfully ... together among family and friends", and asserting that "Mediterranean cuisine is plant-based", citing the ingredients "whole grains, fruits, vegetables, herbs and spices, beans, nuts, seeds, and olive oil", and stating that most foods "in a Mediterranean diet come from plants".

The 1984 Guida all'Italia gastronomica states that "around 1975, under the impulse of one of those new nutritional directives by which good cooking is too often influenced, the Americans discovered the so-called Mediterranean diet. The name even pleased Italian government officials, who made one modification: changing from diet—a word which has always seemed punitive and therefore unpleasant—to Mediterranean cuisine."

A changing cuisine

Since David wrote about Mediterranean food in 1950, and indeed since dietary researchers showed in the 1950s that people around the Mediterranean had less coronary heart disease than the peoples of northern Europe, the traditional Mediterranean ways of life and of eating have changed. Increased wealth and busy lives have led people to eat more meat and less vegetables: their diet is becoming more northern European, with more convenience foods and with less of a preventive effect on cardiovascular disease.

Notes

References

Additional reading

 
 
 
 
  
 
  
 
 
 

 
Mediterranean